Parkwood East light rail station is located off Faldo Court and adjacent to Smith Street Motorway on the eastern portion of Parkwood, a suburb on the Gold Coast. The station is serviced by the Gold Coast G:link light rail system and provides a bus connection. Parkwood East light rail station services the local residential community.

Location 
Below is a map of the local area. The station can be identified by the grey marker.{
  "type": "FeatureCollection",
  "features": [
    {
      "type": "Feature",
      "properties": {},
      "geometry": {
        "type": "Point",
        "coordinates": [
          153.36476862430575,
          -27.96305217758361
        ]
      }
    }
  ]
}

Transport links 
Translink provides an integrated public transport network for the whole of South East Queensland. Surfside buslines under contract from Translink provides a single suburban bus service from the GCUH bus station Helensvale railway station via the Parkwood East station. The light rail service, known as the G:link runs from Broadbeach South to Helensvale via the key activity precincts of Southport and Surfers Paradise.

Below is a list of transport links servicing the Park East light rail station.

External links 

 G:link
 Translink

References 

G:link stations
Railway stations in Australia opened in 2017